The 1934 Bucknell Bison football team was an American football team that represented Bucknell University as an independent during the 1934 college football season. In its first season under head coach Edward Mylin, the team compiled a 7–2–2 record, including a victory in the first Orange Bowl game. The team's only losses were to one-loss Duquesne and undefeated Western Maryland.

The team played its home games at Memorial Stadium in Lewisburg, Pennsylvania.

Schedule

References

Bucknell
Bucknell Bison football seasons
Orange Bowl champion seasons
Bucknell Bison football